George O'Boyle (born 14 December 1967 in Belfast) is a Northern Irish former professional footballer and now manager.

Playing career

Club football
O'Boyle, a striker, began his career in 1984 as a youth-team player with Manchester City. He was part of the Maine Road club's youth academy before earning a two-year contract.

After being released by City when he reached the age of 18, he returned to his native Belfast, finding a home on the Shankill Road, to join Distillery, then managed by Roy Welsh, in November 1985. The club won the County Antrim Shield in his first season.

He moved to Linfield in 1986.

O'Boyle left Northern Ireland in 1988 to join French club Bordeaux.

He returned to Linfield on loan in 1989.

In 1989 he joined Dunfermline Athletic, initially on loan for a year, before signing permanently for £250,000.

In 1994, he was signed by St Johnstone manager Paul Sturrock for a tribunal-decided £200,000 fee. He reached both the high and low points of his career during his seven years at McDiarmid Park. However, injury struck again; O'Boyle once more ruptured a cruciate ligament, while he required two operations on a groin problem.

O'Boyle played in the 1998 Scottish League Cup Final defeat by Rangers.

On 5 January 2001, O'Boyle and St Johnstone teammate Kevin Thomas were sacked following drug-taking allegations. The two players, it was alleged, were found using an unidentified white powder (allegedly cocaine) at the club's Christmas 2000 party in Perth's That Bar. The SPL attempted to overturn the sacking but it was over-ruled by the SFA.

After leaving St Johnstone, O'Boyle joined Raith Rovers for four months, before moving on to Brechin City and Queen of the South, with whom he finished his professional career.

He returned to Northern Ireland to play for Glenavon and Ards, only to return to Scotland in 2004 to play for junior clubs Bo'ness and Kelty Hearts. He failed to make an appearance for the latter club, due to injury.

International football
O'Boyle's international career spanned four years. In 1996, he scored his only Northern Ireland goal in a 1–1 draw with Germany in his hometown of Belfast.

Honours
Distillery
 County Antrim Shield: 1986

Linfield
 NIFL Premier Intermediate League: 1986–87, 1988–89
 Gold Cup: 1988–89
 Irish League Cup: 1986–87

Dunfermline Athletic
 Scottish Football League First Division: 1988–89

St Johnstone
 Scottish Football League First Division: 1996–97

Coaching career
O'Boyle managed Carnoustie Panmure, the final club for which he played.

He would leave football altogether until 2015, when he became assistant to manager Colin McIlwaine at Northern Amateur Football League club Albert Foundry. In the summer of 2016 O'Boyle followed McIlwaine to Lisburn Distillery, again taking up the role of assistant. The duo resigned in April 2019.

O'Boyle and McIlwaine became the new joint-managers of NIFL Championship side Harland & Wolff Welders just a couple of days after departing Distillery. They both left the club in December, seven months after their appointments.

Outside of football
O'Boyle started his own oven-cleaning business in Lisburn in 2010.

References

External links

Profile at Queen of the South (archived version)

1967 births
Ards F.C. players
Association football forwards
Association footballers from Northern Ireland
Bo'ness United F.C. players
Brechin City F.C. players
Carnoustie Panmure F.C. managers
Carnoustie Panmure F.C. players
Dunfermline Athletic F.C. players
Expatriate association footballers from Northern Ireland
Expatriate footballers in France
FC Girondins de Bordeaux players
Football managers from Northern Ireland
Glenavon F.C. players
Kelty Hearts F.C. players
Linfield F.C. players
Lisburn Distillery F.C. players
Living people
Manchester City F.C. players
Northern Ireland B international footballers
Northern Ireland international footballers
Queen of the South F.C. players
Raith Rovers F.C. players
Scottish Football League players
Scottish Junior Football Association players
Scottish Premier League players
Association footballers from Belfast
St Johnstone F.C. players
Lisburn Distillery F.C. managers